Minervarya is a genus of frogs in the family Dicroglossidae from south Asia (Sri Lanka, the Indian subcontinent including Pakistan, Nepal, and Bangladesh), and Nepal and Bhutan. They are also known as cricket frogs or rice frogs.

Taxonomy
The genus Minervarya was erected to resolve the paraphyly of the genus Fejervarya which until 2022, encompassed the species now found in Minervarya. This split was originally proposed in 2018 using the name Zakerana, which is now recognised as a junior synonym to the name Minervarya.

Species 
The following species are recognised in the genus Minervarya:

Minervarya agricola 
Minervarya andamanensis 
Minervarya asmati 
Minervarya brevipalmata 
Minervarya cepfi 
Minervarya charlesdarwini 
Minervarya chiangmaiensis 
Minervarya chilapata 
Minervarya goemchi 
Minervarya gomantaki 
Minervarya greenii 
Minervarya kadar 
Minervarya kalinga 
Minervarya keralensis 
Minervarya kirtisinghei 
Minervarya krishnan 
Minervarya manoharani 
Minervarya marathi 
Minervarya muangkanensis 
Minervarya mysorensis 
Minervarya neilcoxi 
Minervarya nepalensis 
Minervarya nicobariensis 
Minervarya nilagirica 
Minervarya pentali 
Minervarya pierrei 
Minervarya rufescens 
Minervarya sahyadris 
Minervarya sengupti 
Minervarya syhadrensis 
Minervarya teraiensis

References

 
Amphibians of Asia
Amphibian genera
Taxonomy articles created by Polbot